Danny Carson (born 2 February 1981) is an English footballer, who played as a midfielder in the Football League for Chester City.

References

Chester City F.C. players
Winsford United F.C. players
Association football midfielders
English Football League players
1981 births
Living people
People from Huyton
English footballers